University Square may refer to:
 University Square, Bucharest, the site of 1990 protests demanding the exclusion of ex-Communists from Romanian politics
 University Square, in Sanaa, Yemen, more recently known as Change Square (At-Taghir), a focal point of the 2011 Yemeni protests
 University Square (Tampa), a neighborhood of Tampa, Florida
 University Square, San Diego, a neighborhood within the University City area of San Diego, California
 University Square (Madison), a development in Madison, Wisconsin
 Karabük University Square, an urban square in Karabük, Turkey.

See also
 University (disambiguation)